"Iniminimanimo" is a song by the Belgian Eurodance singer Kim Kay. It was released in 1999 on EMI as the fifth single and as well as the fourth track from her debut studio album, La Vie en lilali (1998). It is a Eurodance song that was written by Sidro, Ilbe, and Stef Corbesier and produced by Phil Sterman and Lov Cook.

Track listing

Charts

References

External links
 
 
 

1999 singles
1999 songs
Kim Kay songs
EMI Records singles
French-language songs